The Teatro Pavón, Calle de Embajadores 9, is a theatre in Madrid opened in 1925. The architect was Teodoro de Anasagasti .

Notable premieres
Francisco Alonso's zarzuela Las Leandras - 12 November 1931

References

External links

 Official website in the directory of the Ministerio de Cultura.

Theatres in Madrid
Theatres completed in 1925
Art Deco architecture in Spain
Buildings and structures in Embajadores neighborhood, Madrid